Tyler Strickland is an American composer for film and television. He is best known for providing the scores for acclaimed documentaries such as Rashida Jones's Hot Girls Wanted, CNN's Fresh Dressed, and Netflix's Audrie & Daisy. He also provided the music for Netflix's The Mars Generation. He recently won the 2022 Daytime Emmy for Outstanding Music Direction and Composition for Cat People on Netflix.

Career 
Early in his career as a musician, Strickland toured as a multi-instrumentalist for an artist signed to Capitol Records. During his time as a touring musician, Strickland played along acts such as The Foo Fighters and Journey. In 2010, he began utilizing his talents as an instrumentalist and applying them to film scoring. He quickly found success in 2012 after providing the score for The Genius of Marian, which gained substantial critical acclaim at the TriBeCa film festival.

Philosophy 
Strickland posits that sound is “50 percent of everything we experience on a day to day basis… Without the right music, no environment is complete.” All pacing in regards to score must stem from the on-screen image. He describes this as only way to assure a score is enhancing the film, as opposed to distracting viewers from it. One of the most important elements in Strickland's workflow is communication with a director—he describes this as potentially one of the most "inspiring and exciting" parts of the scoring process.

.

Selected filmography

References

External links

American television composers
American film score composers
American male film score composers